Disk 413 is a 1936 French spy film directed by Richard Pottier and starring Gitta Alpar, Constant Rémy and Jules Berry. It was the French version of the British film Guilty Melody.

Cast
 Gitta Alpar as Marguerite Salvini
 Constant Rémy as Colonel
 Jules Berry as Captain Richard Maury
 Tomas Alcaide
 Gaby Basset as Cecile
 Pierre Finaly
 Jean Galland as Count Illeano / British Intelligence Agent
 Pierre Larquey as Belinsky
 Maximilienne as La princesse

References

Bibliography

External links 
 

1936 films
French spy films
1930s spy films
1930s French-language films
Films directed by Richard Pottier
French multilingual films
Films based on short fiction
French black-and-white films
1936 multilingual films
1930s French films